This is a list of members of the 16th Legislative Assembly of Queensland from May 1907 to February 1908, as elected at the 1907 state election held on 18 May 1907.

The Kidstonites, led by Premier William Kidston in the days before organised political parties and consisting of former Labour and Liberal MPs, won the election; however, Kidston resigned his commission in protest at the Governor's refusal to appoint more members to the Queensland Legislative Council in order to facilitate the passage of key reform measures. The Conservative Opposition leader, Robert Philp, was commissioned to form a government, but it could not command a majority on the floor of the Assembly, and ultimately the Assembly was dissolved and another election called.

See also
1907 Queensland state election
First Kidston Ministry (Kidston) (1906–1907)
Second Philp Ministry (Conservative) (Nov 1907–Feb 1908)

References

 Waterson, Duncan Bruce: Biographical Register of the Queensland Parliament 1860-1929 (second edition), Sydney 2001.
 
 

Members of Queensland parliaments by term
20th-century Australian politicians